Kweichow Moutai Co., Ltd. is a partial publicly traded, partial state-owned enterprise in China, specializing in the production and sales of the spirit Maotai baijiu, together with the production and sale of beverage, food and packaging material, development of anti-counterfeiting technology, and research and development of relevant information technology products.

As of 2021, it is the largest beverage company in the world and China's most valuable non-technology company. In 2022, Kweichow Moutai overtook Tencent as China's largest company by market capitalization.

History 
Its A shares were listed in the Shanghai Stock Exchange in 2001. It is one of the few Chinese listed companies whose share price had exceeded CNY100. The price reached CNY803.5 in 2018.

It is the world's largest distiller and the world's most valuable spirit company, having surpassed Diageo in April 2017.

Kweichow Moutai and Camus started the cooperation in 2004 and Camus became the worldwide exclusive distributor of Moutai products for the duty-free market.

References

External links
 
Kweichow Moutai Overview at World Indicium

Companies in the CSI 100 Index
Companies listed on the Shanghai Stock Exchange
Companies based in Guizhou
Companies owned by the provincial government of China
Drink companies of China
Food and drink companies established in 1999
Chinese beer brands
Distilleries
Chinese companies established in 1999